The Edmunds County Courthouse serving Edmunds County, South Dakota is located on Second Ave. in Ipswich, South Dakota.  It was built in 1931 in Art Deco style as a depression-era public works project.  It was listed on the National Register of Historic Places in 2000.

It is a three-story brick and stone building.

References

Courthouses on the National Register of Historic Places in South Dakota
Art Deco architecture in South Dakota
Government buildings completed in 1931
Edmunds County, South Dakota